Silver barb is a common name for several fishes and may refer to:
Barbonymus gonionotus, known as silver barb in aquaculture, also called the Java barb
Enteromius choloensis, found only in Malawi
Puntius vittatus, also called the greenstripe barb or striped barb